Phoxinellus dalmaticus is a species of ray-finned fish in the family Cyprinidae.
It is found only in Croatia.
Its natural habitats are rivers and inland karsts.
It is threatened by habitat loss.

References

Phoxinellus
Fish described in 2000
Taxonomy articles created by Polbot